West Arm Provincial Park is a provincial park in British Columbia, Canada.

References

Provincial parks of British Columbia
Regional District of Central Kootenay